Chicago Blaze may refer to:

Chicago Blaze (basketball), a professional sports team that played in the National Women's Basketball League from 2002 to 2005
Chicago Blaze (ice hockey), a professional sports team that played in the All American Hockey League in 2008-09
Chicago Blaze (rugby), a rugby union club founded in 1982